Peter James Peacock  (born 27 May 1952) is a Scottish politician who served as Minister for Education and Young People from 2003 to 2006. A member of the Scottish Labour Party, he was a Member of the Scottish Parliament (MSP) for the Highlands and Islands region from 1999 to 2011.

Peacock was convener of the Highland Regional Council from 1995 to 1999.

Peacock was appointed a deputy minister when first elected at the 1999 Scottish Parliament election. He was promoted to Minister for Education and Young People in the Scottish Executive after the 2003 election. 

Due to his position, Peacock was chosen to officially open the newly refurbished Morgan Academy in Dundee, Scotland, in August 2004; after the fire that destroyed the building in 2001. He resigned from his government post in November 2006 due to ill health.

References

External links 
 

1952 births
Living people
Commanders of the Order of the British Empire
Independent politicians in Scotland
Labour MSPs
Members of the Scottish Parliament 1999–2003
Members of the Scottish Parliament 2003–2007
Members of the Scottish Parliament 2007–2011
Place of birth missing (living people)
Leaders of local authorities of Scotland
Scottish Labour councillors